Polat Kaya (born 6 January 1986) is a Turkish professional basketball coach and former player who played at the small forward position. He is assistant coach for London Lions of the British Basketball League (BBL) and the EuroCup.

Professional career 
In 2003, he started his professional career at Darüşşafaka. He transferred to Bandırma B.İ.K. in the 2004-2005 season and then he played at Mersin BB and TED Ankara.

In the 2017–2018 season, he became a member of Türk Telekom. On 29 September 2020, Kaya signed with Lokman Hekim Fethiye Belediyespor.

Coaching career
Following retirement, he has started his coaching career by becoming assistant coach for London Lions of the British Basketball League (BBL).

References

External links 
RealGM profile
TBLStat.net Profile
Basketball Reference profile

1986 births
Living people
Aliağa Petkim basketball players
Bandırma B.İ.K. players
Darüşşafaka Basketbol players
Fethiye Belediyespor players
Hacettepe Üniversitesi B.K. players
Mersin Büyükşehir Belediyesi S.K. players
Petkim Spor players
Small forwards
Basketball players from Istanbul
TED Ankara Kolejliler players
Trabzonspor B.K. players
Türk Telekom B.K. players
Turkish men's basketball players